Sphaeralcea is a genus of flowering plants in the mallow family (Malvaceae). There are about 40-60 species, including annuals, perennials, and shrubs. Most originate in the drier regions of North America, with some known from South America. They are commonly known as globemallows, globe mallows, false mallows or falsemallows. The name of the genus is derived from the Greek words σφαῖρα (sphaira), meaning "sphere," and αλκεα (alkea), meaning "mallow."

The leaves of these plants are spirally arranged, and usually palmate or toothed. Both stems and leaves are downy. Like other Malvaceae, the flowers are saucer- or cup-shaped, with the stamens joined into a column in the center.

Sphaeralcea species are used as food plants by the larvae of some Lepidoptera species including Schinia olivacea, which has been recorded on S. lindheimeri.

Selected species

Sphaeralcea ambigua A.Gray – Desert globemallow
Sphaeralcea angustifolia (Cav.) G.Don – Copper globemallow, narrowleaf desertmallow
Sphaeralcea australis Spegazzini - Southern globemallow
Sphaeralcea bonariensis (Cav.) Griseb. – Latin globemallow
Sphaeralcea caespitosa M.E.Jones  – Tufted globemallow
Sphaeralcea coccinea (Nutt.) Rydb. – Scarlet globemallow, red globemallow, red falsemallow
Sphaeralcea coulteri (S.Watson) A.Gray – Coulter's globemallow
Sphaeralcea digitata (Greene) Rydb. – Juniper globemallow, slippery globemallow
Sphaeralcea emoryi Torr. ex A.Gray – Emory's globemallow
Sphaeralcea fendleri A.Gray – Fendler's globemallow, thicket globemallow
Sphaeralcea gierischii  – Gierisch mallow
Sphaeralcea grossulariifolia (Hook. & Arn.) Rydb. – Gooseberryleaf globemallow, currantleaf globemallow
Sphaeralcea hastulata A.Gray – Spear globemallow, spreading globemallow
Sphaeralcea incana Torr. ex A.Gray – Gray globemallow, soft globemallow, azeentliini
Sphaeralcea janeae (Welsh) Welsh – Jane's globemallow
Sphaeralcea laxa Wooton & Standl. – Caliche globemallow
Sphaeralcea leptophylla (A.Gray) Rydb.  – Scaly globemallow
Sphaeralcea lindheimeri A.Gray – Woolly globemallow
Sphaeralcea munroana (Douglas ex Lindl.) Spach ex A.Gray – Munro's globemallow, whitestem globemallow
Sphaeralcea nutans
Sphaeralcea obtusiloba (Hook.) G.Don
Sphaeralcea orcuttii Rose – Carrizo Creek globemallow
Sphaeralcea palmeri
Sphaeralcea parvifolia A.Nelson – Smallflower globemallow, littleleaf globemallow
Sphaeralcea pedatifida (A.Gray) A.Gray – Palmleaf globemallow
Sphaeralcea philippiana
Sphaeralcea polychroma La Duke – Hot Springs globemallow
Sphaeralcea procera  – Luna County globemallow
Sphaeralcea psoraloides Welsh – Psoralea globemallow
Sphaeralcea rusbyi A.Gray – Rusby's globemallow, cutleaf globemallow
Sphaeralcea subhastata
Sphaeralcea sulphurea
Sphaeralcea wrightii A.Gray – Wright's globemallow

Formerly placed here
Iliamna rivularis (Douglas) Greene (as S. acerifolia Torr. & A.Gray and S. rivularis (Douglas) Torr.)
Phymosia umbellata (Cav.) Kearney (as S. umbellata (Cav.) G.Don)

References

External links
USDA Plants Profile

 
Malvaceae genera